Matthew M. Lewey (December 1848 – August 12, 1935) was an officer in the Union Army, then a politician,  militia officer, and judge in Florida.  He was from Baltimore, Maryland. He served as mayor of Newnansville, Florida from 1875 until 1877. He represented Alachua County in the Florida House of Representatives in 1883. He established the Gainesville Sentinel which became the Florida Sentinel (African American newspaper) when he relocated to Pensacola. He served as its editor and publisher.

He studied at Lincoln University in Pennsylvania and Howard University's Law School.
During the American Civil War he served in the 55th Massachusetts Infantry Regiment.

The New York Public Library has a photo of him.

References

1848 births
1935 deaths
Politicians from Baltimore
Lincoln University (Pennsylvania) alumni
Howard University School of Law alumni
African-American mayors in Florida